Brian Phelan (born 2 December 1934) is an Irish actor, dramatist, and screenwriter. His film work includes The Criminal (1960), The Kitchen (1961) and The Soldier's Tale (1964). While his screenwriting includes The Knockback (two parts, 1985), and The Treaty (1991).

Early life
Phelan was born in Dublin, Ireland in 1934. He first apprenticed as a carpenter at the age of 15. When Phelan was eighteen, he and his family emigrated to Canada. While there, he was able to obtain his first professional job at the Crest Theatre in Toronto as an assistant stage carpenter.

Career
In 1956, Phelan returned to Dublin to pursue his acting career. He appeared in productions at the Abbey Theatre, the Gate Theatre with the Edwards McLiammoir Company, and the Pike Theatre in the 1950s.

Notable film appearances include The Kitchen (1961), HMS Defiant (1962) and the title role in The Soldier's Tale (1964). He also appeared in three Joseph Losey films, The Criminal (1960), The Servant (1963) and Accident  (1967).

While he continued to work as a full-time actor in the 1960s, Phelan began his screenwriting career. His first television play was The Tormentors (1966), starring James Mason and Stanley Baker, produced by ATV. Writing predominantly for television, Phelan’s other works include The Russian Soldier (BBC, 1986), The Emigrants (BBC, 1977), In the Secret State (BBC, 1985), The Ivory Trade (HBO), and No Tears (RTÉ One, 2002). Phelan has written for films as well, including Little Mother (also known as Woman of the Year, 1973), Honeybaby, Honeybaby (1974), and Tailspin: Behind the Korean Airliner Tragedy (1989). His stage plays include The Signalman's Apprentice (1971), which has been produced worldwide, Article Five, Paddy, News, and Soft Shoe Shuffle. In 1961, Phelan co-presented with Robin Fox the first production of Tom Murphy’s A Whistle in the Dark at the Theatre Royal Stratford East and the Apollo Theatre.

Phelan has received awards including the CableACE Award for the Writer of a Dramatic Special for Knockback in 1987, and the Sapporo Prize at the Tokyo International Film Festival for The Russian Soldier. Murphy’s Stroke, a film written by Phelan, won a Jacob’s Award in 1980. He was also awarded the London Irish Post Award for his work on The Treaty (1992), and a Golden Nymph Award for Best Mini Series for No Tears (2002) at the 42nd Monte Carlo Television Festival.

His papers have been acquired by Special Collections at the University of Delaware.

References

External links 
Brian Phelan papers, Special Collections, University of Delaware Library, Newark, Delaware.

1934 births
Living people